Vilai ( Price) is a 2010 Tamil language drama film directed by G. Kamaraj. The film stars Saravanan, Bharani, Udhayathara and newcomer Ritu Soni, with Fathima, Charmila, Shathiga, Krishnamoorthy, Gemini Balaji, Rajasanthuru and Devaraj playing supporting roles. The film, produced by M. Sathia and S. Babu, had musical score by D. Imman and was released on 27 August 2010.

Plot

The jobless Nandhu (Bharani) and his sister Vandana (Ritu Soni) live in a village in Madurai with their parents. Nandhu and Vandana are constantly squabbling like kids. One day, Nandhu gets into a fight to save his friends and Vandana denounces him to the police thus he is arrested. Their father who got fed up with their dispute arrange his daughter marriage but the topper Vandana wants to continue her studies. Nandhu opposes his decision and he convinces her of studying higher studies in Chennai. Nandhu and Vandana come to Chennai, and a call taxi driver kidnaps Vandana. Meanwhile, the Sri Lankan Tamil girl (Udhayathara) and the daughter of a prostitute Mani (Shathiga) are kidnapped in the same way. The three are abducted by a gang of traffickers (Gemini Balaji and Rajasanthuru) along with other girls and plan to sell them.

The Deputy Commissioner of Police Shanmugavel (Saravanan) comes to his rescue and promises him to find his sister. The two travel together between cities, Shanmugavel eventually arrests one of the traffickers and he reveals everything about their prostitution network. Mirchi Maya (Fathima) is a ruthless female don in Andhra Pradesh and the leader of the entire trafficking business. In Andhra Pradesh, they meet DCP Venkatanarayanan (Bhanu Chander) who he is pessimistic about the fate of Vandana but he decides to help them anyway. In the meantime, Mani and the Srilankan Tamil girl committed suicide to save their dignity.

In the past, Shanmugavel lived happily with his wife (Charmila) and little daughter. The local don Farooq Bhai (Devaraj) wanted to take revenge on Shanmugavel who accidentally killed his daughter. Farooq Bhai abducted his daughter and sold her to a prostitution network. However, in spite of these efforts, Shanmugavel could not find her.

To save Vandana, DCP Shanmugavel goes to her brothel and poses as a client. He then selects Vandana but Mirchi Maya already knew about his identity. At that time, the police arrived at the place and ask Mirchi Maya to surrender but she reveals that she is Shanmugavel's daughter and shoots herself in front of her father. The abducted women including Vandana are saved.

Cast

Saravanan as DCP Shanmugavel
Bharani as Nandhu
Udhayathara
Ritu Soni as Vandana
Fathima as Mirchi Maya
Charmila as Shanmugavel's wife
Shathiga as Mani
 Krishnamoorthy
Gemini Balaji as Riaz
Rajasanthuru
Devaraj as Farooq Bhai
Bhanu Chander as DCP Venkatanarayanan (guest appearance)

Production

Director G. Kamaraj, who directed the gangster film Perusu (2005), directed Vilai who was inspired by a real-life story and told the story of a prostitution racket that kidnapped and sold women against their will. Bharani was selected to play the lead role alongside veteran actors Saravanan and Bhanu Chander while Udhayathara, Ritu Soni, Shathiga and Fathima played the female lead. The film was primarily shot in Chennai and Madurai.

Soundtrack

The film score and the soundtrack were composed by D. Imman. The soundtrack features 4 tracks. The audio was released on 23 May 2010 in Chennai. Directors Samuthirakani, Vetrimaaran, V. C. Guhanathan, K. Bhagyaraj and A. L. Vijay attended the audio launch.

Release
The film was released on 27 August 2010 alongside five other films.

Critical reception
The New Indian Express said, "it misses the emotional punch, the script never really allows us to get involved or empathise with the plight of the girls. On the flip side, it is appreciable that the director has chosen a socially relevant theme, and that he has resisted slipping in sleaze, or any overt skin show". S. R. Ashok Kumar of The Hindu praised the cast and wrote, "director G. Kamaraj handles the scenes deftly and with sensitivity. However, he could have looked into the slow pace of the first half". Sify stated, "the film is too long winded and moves at a snail pace. There is also too much mush and melodrama, towards the climax ".

Box office
The film took a below average opening at the Chennai box office.

References

2010 films
2010s Tamil-language films
Indian drama films
Films shot in Chennai
Films shot in Madurai
Films scored by D. Imman
2010 drama films